The grey-streaked honeyeater (Ptiloprora perstriata), also known as the black-backed honeyeater, is a species of bird in the family Meliphagidae.  It is found in the New Guinea Highlands. Its natural habitat is subtropical or tropical moist montane forests.

References

grey-streaked honeyeater
Birds of New Guinea
grey-streaked honeyeater
Taxonomy articles created by Polbot